Edison Mafla (born August 14, 1974) is a former Colombian footballer who played for clubs in Colombia, Spain, Peru and Chile.

Honours

References

1974 births
Living people
Colombian footballers
Colombian expatriate footballers
Colombia international footballers
1997 Copa América players
Independiente Santa Fe footballers
América de Cali footballers
Deportivo Cali footballers
Villarreal CF players
Cortuluá footballers
S.D. Aucas footballers
Club Alianza Lima footballers
Universidad de Chile footballers
Categoría Primera A players
Chilean Primera División players
Peruvian Primera División players
Expatriate footballers in Chile
Expatriate footballers in Peru
Expatriate footballers in Spain
Expatriate footballers in Ecuador
Colombian expatriate sportspeople in Chile
Colombian expatriate sportspeople in Peru
Colombian expatriate sportspeople in Spain
Colombian expatriate sportspeople in Ecuador
Association football midfielders
Sportspeople from Valle del Cauca Department